Afterlife is an EP by IDM artist Global Goon. It was released in 1997 on Rephlex Records. The EP preceded Cradle of History, his second album for the company. The title track, "Afterlife", also appears on Cradle of History.

Track listing 
"Afterlife"  – 4:30
"Afterlife (Spidermix)"  – 4:05
"Woo"  – 3:29
"Logger"  – 3:15
"Balloon"  – 3:49
"Fin"  – 8:10

References 
Global Goon – Afterlife

1997 EPs
Global Goon albums
Rephlex Records EPs